1807 in sports describes the year's events in world sport.

Boxing
Events
 John Gully wins the English championship following Hen Pearce's retirement due to ill health.

Cricket
Events
 John Willes of Kent first tries to revive the idea of "straight-armed" (i.e., roundarm) bowling, which originated with Tom Walker in the 1790s.
England
 Most runs – William Lambert 355 (HS 110)
 Most wickets – John Wells 24

Curling
 Establishment of the Royal Montreal Curling Club, the oldest sports club still active in North America

Horse racing
England
 The Derby – Election
 The Oaks – Briseis
 St Leger Stakes – Paulina

References

 
1807